CRH may refer to:
 Calibre radius head, a traditional British ordnance term for a concept in ballistic projectile design
 Celtic Resources Holdings, an Irish mining company
 China Railway High-speed, a high-speed railway service operated by China Railways
 Choate Rosemary Hall, a private boarding school in Wallingford, Connecticut
 Coin roll hunting, the hobby of searching change pulled from circulation for collectible coins
 Combat Rescue Helicopter (HH-60W), being developed for the US Air Force based on the Sikorsky UH-60 Black Hawk
 Corticotropin-releasing hormone, a polypeptide hormone and neurotransmitter involved in the stress response
 CRH plc, a building materials company, based in Ireland
 Crimean Tatar language's ISO 639-2 code
 Crouch Hill railway station, a railway station in England (National Rail station code: CRH)